Natalie Claire Snodgrass (born December 17, 1998) is an American ice hockey forward, currently playing for the Minnesota Whitecaps in the Premier Hockey Federation (PHF). Prior to signing with the Whitecaps during the summer of 2022, she was a two-year captain for the UConn Huskies women's ice hockey team.

Career 

During her teenage years, she captained the girls' hockey team at Eastview High School, finishing as the school's all-time leading scorer. She was named Pioneer Press Metro Player of the Year in 2016.

In 2017, she began attending the University of Connecticut, playing for the university's women's ice hockey programme. She scored 38 points in 38 games in her rookie NCAA season, leading Connecticut in points and being named to the Hockey East All-Rookie Team. Her point production dipped slightly the following year, down to 29 points in 36 games, however she finished as the university's leading scorer for the second consecutive year. She was named an assistant captain for the team ahead of the 2019–20 season, where she would again lead Connecticut in scoring. She notched her 100th career collegiate point with a game-winning goal in the Hockey East Quarterfinals, the fifth player in Connecticut history to reach the mark.

International career 

Snodgrass represented the United States at the 2015 and 2016 IIHF World Women's U18 Championship, scoring a total of seven points in ten games as the country won gold both times.

When the players of the senior American national team went on strike over pay and working conditions in 2017, she was invited to join the roster for the 2017 IIHF World Championship as a replacement for the striking players. She refused the invitation, standing in solidarity with the players.

Style of play 

Snodgrass has been described as a power forward with deceptive speed, but with a tendency to be undisciplined on the ice.

Personal life 

Snodgrass studied health sciences at the University of Connecticut. Her sister, Emily Snodgrass, also played hockey for Connecticut from 2011 to 2015, and played in the European Women's Hockey League with the EV Bozen Eagles.

References

External links
 

1998 births
Living people
American women's ice hockey forwards
Ice hockey players from Minnesota
Minnesota Whitecaps players
People from Eagan, Minnesota
Premier Hockey Federation players
UConn Huskies women's ice hockey players
21st-century American women